Kavale or Kavalem is a village in Ponda, Goa, India. Kavle/Kawale/Kawle are other variations for the same name.

Main Attraction

Situated at the foothill of Kavalem, the Shantadurga Temple boasts of a huge tank, a Dipa Stambha and Agrashalas.Current temple was constructed during the reign of Maratha Empire ruler Chattrapati Shahu Maharaj of Satara during the period from 1713 AD to 1738 AD. Naroram Rege Mantri originally from Kochara village in the Vengurla Taluka,(Konkan) was a Mantri (Minister) in Chattrapati Shahu Maharaj Ashtapradhan Mandal at Satara (Grandson of Chh.Shivaji Maharaj). Due to his efforts, the village of Kavalem was bequeathed to the Temple by Shrimant Baji Rao I Peshwa in 1738–39.

The temples of Shree Shantadurgaat Kavale and Shree Manguesh located at Mangeshi Village, two of the most revered patron deities of the GSB community in Goa. The Managing Committee has banned tourists.

History
The original site of Shri Shantadurga temple is Kardelivana of Quelossim(Keloshi) in mormugao Taluka. To avoid the increasing Portuguese missionary activities in Goa, the GSB community was afraid for the safety of the temples and idols. Hence, the families worshipping Shree Shantadurga and Shree Manguesh, on a moonless night, leaving their homes and hearths crossed over the Zuari River to a safer region which was under the rule of the Muslim King Adilshah. They finally installed the deity at Kavale village known then as Kapilpura or Kaivalyapura in the Antruj Taluka(Present day Ponda).

The territory of Ponda was not under Portuguese rule in the 16th century and hence was seen as a haven by the Hindus fleeing persecution by the Jesuits and Portuguese. The forests of Ponda were ideal places for Hindus to form makeshift temples with the Idols they had salvaged from the broken temples of Sashti (Salcete).

Reaching Kavale Village

By train
 The nearest town of Ponda is located at a distance of 17 km from Carambolim railway station.
 The major railway terminus of Margao has bus services catering up to Ponda.

By road
 Local bus services operated by private bus owners ply regularly from Ponda Bus Stand.
 Motorcycle pilot bike rides from Farmagudi (situated on the Ponda-Panaji road) are available.

See also 
 Shanta Durga temple
 Mangeshi Village
 Mangueshi Temple

Villages in North Goa district